For mine construction, an engine shaft is a mine shaft used for the purpose of pumping, irrespective of the prime mover.

See also
Outline of mining

References

Underground mining